Avoine is the name of the following communes in France:

 Avoine, Indre-et-Loire, in the Indre-et-Loire department
 Avoine, Orne, in the Orne department